Isenburg-Philippseich was a County of southern Hesse, Germany. It was created in 1711 as a partition of Isenburg-Offenbach, and was mediatised to Isenburg in 1806.

Gallery

Counts of Isenburg 

Counties of the Holy Roman Empire
House of Isenburg
States and territories established in 1711
1711 establishments in the Holy Roman Empire